Karta (also Romanized as Kārtā) is a village in Pian Rural District, in the Central District of Izeh County, Khuzestan Province, Iran. At the 2006 census, its population was 732, in 137 families.

References 

Populated places in Izeh County